Mount Valin is the highest mountain of the Saguenay–Lac-Saint-Jean region (as measured from sea level) in the Canadian province of Quebec.

Mount Valin is an important site used for transmission facilities for radio and television stations in the region. Stations broadcasting from Mount Valin are television stations CFRS-DT, CKTV-DT and CIVV-DT; and radio stations CFIX-FM, CJAB-FM and CION-FM-2.

Mount Valin is part of the Monts-Valin National Park and home to the Le Valinouët ski centre.

References

Mountains of Quebec under 1000 metres
Mount Valin
Canada geography articles needing translation from French Wikipedia